The Methodist Episcopal Church was the first Methodist denomination founded in the United States.

Methodist Episcopal Church may also refer to:
 Methodist Episcopal Church, South (Daphne, Alabama)
 Methodist Episcopal Church (Yuma, Arizona)
 Methodist Episcopal Church, South (Bald Knob, Arkansas)
 Methodist Episcopal Church, South (Dardanelle, Arkansas)
 Methodist Episcopal Church, South (Paris, Arkansas)
 Methodist Episcopal Church (Idaho Springs, Colorado)
 Methodist Episcopal Church (Greenwich, Connecticut)
 Methodist Episcopal Church (Emmett, Idaho)
 Methodist Episcopal Church (Salem, Illinois)
 Methodist Episcopal Church (Lancaster, Kentucky)
 Methodist Episcopal Church (Ottawa, Minnesota)
 Hamline Methodist Episcopal Church, St. Paul, Minnesota, listed on the NRHP in Ramsey County
 Methodist Episcopal Church (Bozeman, Montana)
 Methodist Episcopal Church (Three Forks, Montana), listed on the NRHP in Gallatin County
Methodist Episcopal Church (Stratford, New Hampshire), listed on the New Hampshire State Register of Historic Places
 Methodist Episcopal Church (Hibernia, New Jersey)
 Methodist Episcopal Church (Madison, New Jersey)
 Methodist Episcopal Church (Dryden, New York)
 Methodist Episcopal Church (Orleans, New York)
 Methodist Episcopal Church (Stony Creek, New York)
 Methodist Episcopal Church (Devils Lake, North Dakota)
 Methodist Episcopal Church (Crestline, Ohio)
 Methodist Episcopal Church, South (Checotah, Oklahoma)
 Methodist Episcopal Church, South (Lawton, Oklahoma)
 Methodist Episcopal Church (Pierre, South Dakota)
 Methodist Episcopal Church (Scotland, South Dakota)
 Methodist Episcopal Church (Stannard, Vermont)
 Methodist Episcopal Church (Swanton, Vermont)
 Methodist Episcopal Church (Buffalo, Wyoming)

See also
Methodist Episcopal Church, South (disambiguation)
First Methodist Episcopal Church (disambiguation)